Gaveh-ye Seyyed Mohammad Hoseyni (also Romanized as Gaveh-ye Seyyed Moḩammad Ḩoseynī) is a village in Ozgoleh Rural District, Ozgoleh District, Salas-e Babajani County, Kermanshah Province, Iran. At the 2006 census, its population was 71, in 15 families.

References 

Populated places in Salas-e Babajani County